Belarus and Vietnam established official relations since 1991, with the collapse of the Soviet Union. Belarus has an official embassy in Hanoi and Vietnam has its counterpart in Minsk.

History

A number of Belarusians, mostly advisers and pilots were sent to North Vietnam to assist its communist ally in the Vietnam War as part of the USSR.

Since 1991, Belarus and Vietnam enjoy a relative close relations, though not as much as Vietnam's relations with two other East Slavic nations, Russia and Ukraine. Belarus has played a small role on developing the closeness with Vietnam, as Vietnam is quite reliant on assistance from military hardware from former Soviet Union, including Belarus. Over Vietnam's tensions with China (another partner of Belarus), Belarus seeks a neutral position.

Alexander Lukashenko had taken visits to Vietnam in a number of foreign trip; and had confirmed his support to Vietnam in a number of issues.

There is a small Vietnamese community in Belarus.

References

External links
Embassy of the Republic of Belarus in Socialist Republic of Vietnam
Embassy of the Socialist Republic of Vietnam in the Republic of Belarus

 
Vietnam
Bilateral relations of Vietnam